Bloody Sunday: Scenes from the Saville Inquiry is a 2005 dramatisation by English journalist Richard Norton-Taylor of four years of evidence of the Saville Inquiry, distilled into two hours of stage performance by Tricycle Theatre in London.

References

Further reading
 

Off-Broadway plays
2005 plays
English plays
Plays based on actual events
Works about The Troubles (Northern Ireland)
Laurence Olivier Award-winning plays
West End plays